Tomás Javier Giménez Benítez (born 3 July 1992) is a Paraguayan professional footballer who plays as a midfielder.

Clubs
 Universidad de Concepción 2011–2012

External links
 

1992 births
Living people
Association football midfielders
Paraguayan footballers
Universidad de Concepción footballers
Chilean Primera División players
Paraguayan expatriate footballers
Paraguayan expatriate sportspeople in Chile
Expatriate footballers in Chile